The Birman, also called the "Sacred Cat of Burma", is a domestic cat breed. The Birman is a long-haired, colour-pointed cat distinguished by a silky coat, deep blue eyes, and contrasting white "gloves" on each paw.

The breed name is derived from Birmanie, the French form of Burma. The Birman breed was first recognized in France by the Cat Club de France in 1925, then in England by the Governing Council of the Cat Fancy (GCCF) in 1966 and in United States by the Cat Fanciers' Association (CFA) in 1967. It is also recognized by the Canadian Cat Association (CCA) and the International Cat Association (TICA) in 1979.

History
No clear record of the breed's origin exists. They are most often claimed to have originated as the companions of temple priests in northern Burma in the Mount of Lugh. Many stories exist of how the cats first came to France, including pairs of cats being given as a reward for helping defend a temple, or being smuggled out of Burma by a Vanderbilt. Another pair of Birmans (or a pregnant female called Poupée de Maldapour) were said to have been stolen and later imported to France by Thadde Haddisch. The first traces of historical Birmans go back to a Mme Leotardi in Nice, France.

Many believe, as legend will tell, that the breed originated in Burma (now known as Myanmar) among the temples of ancient times and alongside priests; however, there are also some that later believed the felines came to Europe, namely France, from somewhere in Asia, which has been spread from other legends and stories passed around as well. Regardless of the numerous stories and folklore that go around, there is a positivity that the Birman cat breed was found in France as early as the 1920s, and many different stories continue to surface about the mystique that lies behind their history.

Birmans were almost wiped out as a breed during World War II. Only two cats were alive in Europe at the end of the war, a pair named Orloff and Xenia de Kaabaa, both belonging to Baudoin-Crevoisier. The foundation of the breed in postwar France were offspring of this pair. They had to be heavily outcrossed with long-hair breeds such as Persian and Siamese to rebuild the Birman breed. By the early 1950s, pure Birman litters were again being produced. The restored breed was recognized in Britain in 1965 and by the CFA in 1966.

The first Birman cats were seal point. The blue point colour was introduced in 1959 using blue Persian lines. New colours were later added by English breeders including chocolate, red, and tabby/lynx points. Birmans have also been used in the development of new breeds such as the Ragdoll.

Appearance

Birmans have a medium-sized, rectangular body with a broad face and distinct Roman nose. Their ears are ideally as wide on the base as they are tall and should be set as much on top of the head as on the side. The eyes are rounded and should be a deep sapphire blue.

The Birman's fur is medium-long and should have a silky texture. Unlike a Persian or Himalayan, they have no undercoat, thus are much less prone to matting. Coat colour is always pointed, save for the contrasting pure white, symmetrical "gloves" on each paw that are the trademark of the breed. The white must involve all toes and in front must stop at the articulation or at the transition of toes to metacarpals. These gloves should extend noticeably further up the back of the leg (referred to as the "laces"), finishing with an inverted V extended half to three-fourths up the hock. Any other spot of white on the points is considered a serious fault. The base body colour is white to cream, with a wash of colour that corresponds to the points, but is much paler.

Recognized point colours are seal, chocolate, blue, lilac (a softer silver-grey), red, or cream. Tabby and tortie variations in seal, chocolate, blue or lilac are also allowed; other colours are in development.

Like all colour-point breeds, Birman kittens are born white and begin developing their points after one week if a dark colour (i.e. seal point) and 14 days or more if the points are "clear" or lighter-coloured (i.e. lilac point). Their coats do not reach full development up until the cats are two years old.

Genetic diversity
The 2008 study "The Ascent of Cat Breeds: Genetic Evaluations of Breeds and Worldwide Random-bred Populations" by Lipinski et al.  found that the Birman has one of the lowest levels of genetic diversity of all the breeds studied. This is no surprise given the breed history.

Health
The most severe threat is feline hypertrophic cardiomyopathy (HCM), the most common heart disease seen in cats. In Birman cats, it is thought to be inherited as an autosomal dominant trait. HCM is a progressive disease and can result in heart failure, paralysis of the hind legs due to clot embolisation originating in the heart, and sudden death.

Paltrinieri, Giraldi, Prolo, Scarpa, et al. (2017) found that Birman cats have a high serum concentration of creatinine and symmetric dimethylarginine, but most Birman cats have higher concentrations of creatinine than SDMA. Creatinine is a creatine phosphate and is produced during metabolism of creatine, and is excreted through urination. SDMA is a methylated form of the amino acid arginine and is released during normal catabolisms of body proteins. Levels of creatinine and SDMA are found when Birman cats are tested for chronic kidney disease, for which they are at high risk. Birman cats are also at risk of developing feline infectious peritonitis; a disease that alters the renal function (creatinine levels in blood and urine) in the cats.

Feline audiogenic reflex seizures (FARS), a recently discovered type of epilepsy in cats, is believed to be particularly common in Birman cats.

Birman naming conventions
Many Birman breeders follow the French tradition of assigning all kittens born in a particular year given names that begin with the same letter of the alphabet. Countries with breeders using this convention include Australia, Canada, France, New Zealand, the U.K., and the U.S. Kittens born in 2016 would start with 'N', and in 2017 'O', and so on.

Famous Birman cats 
 Choupette (born 2011), pet of fashion designer Karl Lagerfeld

References

Cat breeds
Cat breeds originating in France
Cat breeds originating in Myanmar